Rescue California was the political committee that orchestrated the 2003 recall election of California Governor Gray Davis. It was primarily funded by Congressman Darrell Issa (Republican-California).

References 

Politics of California
Political advocacy groups in the United States